The Eagle  is a 2011 epic historical drama film set in Roman Britain directed by Kevin Macdonald, and starring Channing Tatum, Jamie Bell and Donald Sutherland. Adapted by Jeremy Brock from Rosemary Sutcliff's historical adventure novel The Eagle of the Ninth (1954), the film tells the story of a young Roman officer attempting to recover the lost Roman eagle standard of his father's legion in Caledonia. The story is based on the Ninth Spanish Legion's supposed disappearance in Britain. Historically, the purported disappearance of the Ninth Legion in Northern Britain is a subject of debate.

The film was a UK–US co-production. It was released in the United States on 11 February 2011 and in the United Kingdom on 25 March 2011. The film received mixed reviews from critics and grossed $38 million against its $25 million budget.

Plot
In the year 149 AD, twenty years after the Ninth Legion disappeared in the north of Britain, Marcus Flavius Aquila, a young Roman centurion, arrives in Roman Britain to serve at his first post as a garrison commander. Marcus's father, who was the Senior Centurion of the ninth, disappeared with the eagle standard of the ill-fated legion, and Marcus hopes to redeem his family's honour by bravely serving in Britain. Shortly afterwards, only Marcus's alertness and decisiveness save the garrison from being overrun by Celtic tribesmen in a local insurrection. He is decorated for his bravery but honourably discharged due to a severe leg injury.

Living at his uncle's estate near Calleva (modern Silchester) in southern Britain, Marcus has to cope with his military career having been cut short and his father's name still being held in disrepute. Hearing rumours that the eagle standard has been seen in the north of Britain, Marcus decides to recover it. Despite the warnings of his uncle and his fellow Romans, who believe that no Roman can survive north of Hadrian's Wall, he travels north into the territory of the Picts, accompanied only by his slave, Esca. The son of a deceased chieftain of the Brigantes, Esca detests Rome and what it stands for, but considers himself bound to Marcus, who saved his life during an amphitheatre show.

After several weeks of travelling through the northern wilderness, Esca and Marcus encounter Guern, a Roman-born Lucius Caius Metellus, one of the survivors of the Ninth Legion, who attributes his survival to the hospitality of the Selgovae tribe. Guern recalls that all but a small number of deserters were killed in an ambush by the northern tribes – including Esca's Brigantes – and that the eagle standard was taken away by the Seal People, the most vicious of the tribes. The two travel further north until they are found by the Seal People. Identifying himself as a chieftain's son fleeing Roman rule and claiming Marcus as his slave, Esca is welcomed by the tribe. After allowing the Seal People to mistreat Marcus, Esca eventually reveals that his actions were a ploy and helps his master to find the eagle. As they retrieve it, they are ambushed by several warriors, including the Seal prince's father, the chief of the tribe. Marcus and Esca manage to kill them. Prior to dying, the chief reveals that he killed Marcus's father, who apparently begged for his life. Furthermore, the chief is revealed to be wearing Marcus's father's ring. Marcus does not understand Celtic and asks Esca to translate, but Esca never reveals the fate of Marcus's father. With the aid of the Seal prince's young son, they escape from the village.

The two flee south in an effort to reach Hadrian's Wall, with the Seal People in pursuit. Marcus, slowed by his old battle wound, orders Esca to take the eagle back to Roman territory and even grants the reluctant slave his freedom. Freed, Esca still refuses to abandon his friend and instead heads out to look for help. He returns with the survivors of the Ninth Legion just as the Seal People catch up with them. Guern reveals to Marcus that he saw Marcus's father die. He assures Marcus that his father was not a coward and fought to the end. The legionaries, wishing to redeem themselves, accept Aquila as their commander and prepare to defend the eagle standard. As an example to those who would betray their people, the Seal prince kills his young son in front of Esca, Marcus, and the legionaries. He then orders his warriors to attack. A battle ensues, in which all the Seal warriors are killed, along with most of the Ninth Legion soldiers, including Guern. Marcus kills the Seal prince by drowning him in the river. With the enemy defeated, the bodies of both Britons and Romans are laid out by the victors. As Marcus commends their valour, he lights a funeral pyre for Guern. As Guern is cremated, Marcus, Esca and the few survivors of the Ninth return to Roman territory, where Aquila delivers the eagle to the astonished governor in Londinium. There is some talk of the Ninth Legion being reformed with Marcus as its commander. But when Marcus and Esca wonder what they will do next, Marcus leaves the decision to Esca.

Alternative ending
An alternative ending is featured in the DVD. Marcus decides to burn the eagle standard on the altar where the final battle occurred, instead of delivering it to the Roman governor. He tells Esca that he does this because the eagle belongs to the men who fought for it. Marcus and Esca are then shown approaching Hadrian's Wall on foot and talking about their plans for the future.

Main cast
Channing Tatum as Marcus Flavius Aquila
Jamie Bell as Esca
Donald Sutherland as Marcus's Uncle Aquila
Mark Strong as Guern/Lucius Caius Metellus
Tahar Rahim as Prince of the Seal People
Denis O'Hare as Centurion Lutorius
Douglas Henshall as Cradoc
Paul Ritter as Galba
Dakin Matthews as Legate Claudius
Pip Carter as Tribune Placidus
Ned Dennehy as Chief of the Seal People

Production

Principal photography began on 24 August 2009 in Hungary, which doubles for what was later to become England. In October, production moved to Scotland, where filming took place in Wester Ross and at Loch Lomond, among other locations. The film was made for around £15 million by producer Duncan Kenworthy's Toledo Productions for co-financiers Focus Features and Film4. Kevin Macdonald directed from a script by Jeremy Brock, who adapted the 1954 historical adventure novel of the same name by Rosemary Sutcliff. The director of photography was Anthony Dod Mantle, production design was by Michael Carlin, the costume design was by Michael O'Connor, and Justine Wright edited the film—her fifth for Macdonald. At the 62nd Cannes Film Festival in May 2009, The Eagle of the Ninth secured distribution deals "for every global market".

Macdonald intended the film to be historically authentic, but as little is certain about the tribes that the Romans encountered—they were generally Celtic peoples, though some may have been Picts—he made concessions. For example, the tribespeople spoke Gaelic, even though the language probably did not enter widespread use in the region until the 5th century AD; Pictish is the more likely language to have been spoken at the time. "It's the best we can do," Macdonald said. "All you can do is build on a few clues and trust your own instincts. That way, no one can tell you you were wrong." Only 1% of Scots speak Gaelic, limiting the talent pool to just 60,000 people. By August 2009, several Gaelic-speaking boys had auditioned for the role of a boy of the Seal people, aged nine to twelve, but without success, so Macdonald held open auditions in Glasgow for the role. It was eventually given to nine-year-old Thomas Henry from New Barnsley, Belfast, who had been educated in Irish Gaelic.

Macdonald described his view of the Seal people:They were a more indigenous folk than the Celts, who were from farther south ... They were probably small and dark, like the Inouit [sic], living off seals and dressed in sealskins. We are going to create a culture about which no one knows much, but which we will make as convincing as possible. We are basing it on clues gained from places like Skara Brae and the Tomb of the Eagles in Orkney, so that we will have them worshipping pagan symbols, like the seal and the eagle. The reason they have seized the emblem of the Roman eagle from the legion is because to them it [was] a sacred symbol.

Achiltibuie, a village in northwest Scotland, was used as a filming location for the "Seal People". Filming started in Achiltibuie on 7 October 2009 and finished on 15 October 2009. The main location was Fox Point, Old Dornie. The Pictish village which was constructed at Fox Point was used on most days of the filming. Other sites included Achnahaird beach, where a horse chase was filmed, and Loch Lurgainn. Macdonald intended to use locals as extras. This was a success with many locals appearing as extras after going to castings in nearby Ullapool. Their roles included "Seal Warriors", "Seal Princesses" and "Elders".

In a reversal of Hollywood films about the Roman Empire, Macdonald said the Romans are played by American actors and Rome's enemies by British actors, while the British actors Paul Ritter, Mark Strong and Pip Carter used American accents to play their Roman characters. The Romans are played by Americans "to achieve a little contemporary symbolism", with Bell using a neutral English accent.

According to Channing Tatum, the actors trained 4–5 hours a day for each role.

Although the film mostly stuck to the plot of Sutcliff's novel, there were a few modifications and condensations, e.g. it introduced a few violent scenes into what had been a novel written for younger children.

Release

Critical reception
On review aggregator Rotten Tomatoes the film holds approval rating of 39% based on 160 reviews, with an average rating of 5.30/10. The website's critics consensus reads: "The Eagle has a pleasantly traditional action-adventure appeal, but it's drowned out by Kevin Macdonald's stolid direction and Channing Tatum's uninspired work in the central role." Metacritic gave the film a weighted average score of 55 out of 100, based on 35 critics, indicating "mixed or average reviews". Audiences polled by CinemaScore gave the film an average grade of "C+" on an A+ to F scale.

Roger Ebert gave The Eagle three stars out of four, saying that "it evokes the energy of traditional sword-and-shield movies" and praising its realistic battle scenes and limited use of CGI.

Box office
The Eagle grossed $19.5 million in the United States and Canada, and $18.5 million in other territories, for a worldwide gross of $38 million, against its $25 million budget.

In the United States, The Eagle was released on 11 February 2011, in 2,296 theatres. It grossed $8,684,464 during its opening weekend, ranking fourth behind Gnomeo & Juliet, Justin Bieber: Never Say Never and Just Go With It.

Home media
The Eagle was released on DVD and Blu-ray Disc on 21 June 2011.

See also
The Eagle of the Ninth
Centurion, a 2010 film with similar themes.
Legio IX Hispana
2011 in film
Survival film

References

External links
 
 
 
 
 

2011 films
2011 action drama films
2010s adventure drama films
2010s historical films
British adventure drama films
British epic films
British historical films
American adventure drama films
American buddy action films
American epic films
British action films
2010s English-language films
English-language Irish films
Irish-language films
Fiction set in Roman Britain
Films about friendship
Films based on British novels
Films based on historical novels
Films directed by Kevin Macdonald (director)
Films scored by Atli Örvarsson
Films set in the Roman Empire
Films set in the 2nd century
Films set in England
Films set in Hampshire
Films shot in Budapest
Films shot in Highland (council area)
Films set in Scotland
Scottish Gaelic-language films
Films shot in Glasgow
Films shot in Argyll and Bute
Film4 Productions films
Alliance Films films
Focus Features films
Universal Pictures films
Picts in fiction
2010s buddy films
Peplum films
2010s American films
2010s British films